Psilocerea melanops is a species of moth of the  family Geometridae. It is found in Uganda.

This species has length of the forewings of 17–19 mm, a chamois ground colour, irrorated with darker scales and speckled with some black scales.

Carcasson suggested that this species may be wrongly placed in this genus as it differs from other species in the straight margin of the forewings.

References

Ennominae
Moths described in 1965